Mellingen Heitersberg is a railway station in the municipality of Mellingen in the Swiss canton of Aargau.  

The station is located on the Heitersberg line, part of the Zurich to Olten main line, just west of  the western portal to the Heitersberg Tunnel.

The station is served by service S11 of the Zurich S-Bahn.

References

External links 
 

Railway stations in the canton of Aargau
Swiss Federal Railways stations